David Griffiths  (born 16 February 1939) is a Welsh portrait painter.

Biography
He was born to a Welsh family in Liverpool, England, but the family moved to Pwllheli when he was seven. He studied at the Slade School of Fine Art, London under the direction of Professor Sir William Coldstream.

Regarded as one of the U.K's foremost portrait painters, David Griffiths' large output of work include portraits of royalty, ambassadors, archbishops, Lords Chancellor, distinguished parliamentarians, and well-known musicians and actors. It was his portrait of Prince Charles on the occasion of Charles' investiture as Prince of Wales in 1969 which brought him to general notice. This remains one of 
He has also painted William Stamps Farish III (ex-U.S. Ambassador to the United Kingdom), Enoch Powell, and a long list of Welsh notables including Barry John, Gwynfor Evans, John Meurig Thomas, Lord Tonypandy (as Speaker of the House of Commons), Siân Phillips, Bryn Terfel and Sir Geraint Evans.

The Midland Bank sponsored a major exhibition of his work at the 1970 National Eisteddfod. In 2002, the National Library of Wales held a retrospective show of his work.

Over sixty of his oil paintings are in UK university or gallery collections.

He was appointed a Member of the Order of the British Empire (MBE) in the 2019 New Year Honours for services to Art, particularly Portrait Painting.

References

 

20th-century Welsh painters
20th-century British male artists
21st-century Welsh painters
21st-century Welsh male artists
21st-century male artists
1939 births
Living people
Alumni of the Slade School of Fine Art
Welsh portrait painters
Members of the Order of the British Empire
Welsh male painters
20th-century Welsh male artists